Pentaspadon motleyi is a species of plant in the family Anacardiaceae. It is found in Indonesia, Malaysia, Papua New Guinea, and the Solomon Islands. It is threatened by habitat loss. Its fruit and its seeds are edible after cooking. Its timber is weak but still used locally for certain applications. It also abundantly produces an oil which is used for skin conditions.

References

motleyi
Data deficient plants
Taxonomy articles created by Polbot